James W. Brown II (July 14, 1844 – October 23, 1909) was a Republican member of the U.S. House of Representatives from Pennsylvania. He was born in Pittsburgh, Pennsylvania. He worked in the iron and steel industry and served as vice president of the Crucible Steel Company. He was also engaged in banking, and was trustee of the Dollar Savings Bank.

James W. Brown II was a member of the South Fork Fishing and Hunting Club, whose earthen dam failed in May 1889, causing the Johnstown Flood. At the time of the Johnstown Flood, Brown was the secretary and treasurer of the Hussey, Howe and Company Steel Works Ltd.  Soon after the disaster, Brown and several others of the Pittsburgh upper class bought summer vacation properties on Lake Muskoka, in Ontario, Canada, centered near the town of Beaumaris.

Brown was married to Clara Palmer Howe, the eighth child of U.S. Representative Thomas Marshall Howe and Mary Ann Palmer. James W. Brown II was the great-great-grandson of Fur Trader and Indian Agent/Interpreter Thomas McKee, who served under General Forbes at Fort Pitt circa 1758. He was a descendant of James McKee, whose mother, Margaret Tecumsepah Opessa was an older sister to Metheotashe Mary Opessa, the mother of Tecumseh, the great Shawnee leader and Tenskwatawa, the Shawnee Prophet. James W. Brown II was also brother-in-law to Pittsburgh Mayor and American ambassador to Japan, George W. Guthrie.

Brown was elected as an Independent Republican to the Fifty-eighth Congress. He declined to be a candidate for renomination in 1904. He resumed his former business pursuits and served as president of the Colonial Steel Company. He died at Pointe Mouillee, Michigan. Interment in Allegheny Cemetery in Pittsburgh.

Sources

The Political Graveyard

External links

1844 births
1909 deaths
American steel industry businesspeople
Members of the United States House of Representatives from Pennsylvania
Businesspeople from Pittsburgh
Politicians from Pittsburgh
Pennsylvania Republicans
Pennsylvania Independents
Independent Republican members of the United States House of Representatives
Burials at Allegheny Cemetery
19th-century American politicians
19th-century American businesspeople